The 1917–18 NCAA men's basketball season began in December 1917, progressed through the regular season, and concluded in March 1918.

Season headlines 

 The Pacific Coast Conference did not play as a basketball conference during the 1917–18 season.
 In February 1943, the Helms Athletic Foundation retroactively selected Syracuse as its national champion for the 1917–18 season.
 In 1995, the Premo-Porretta Power Poll retroactively selected Syracuse as its national champion for the 1917–18 season.

Conference membership changes

Regular season

Conference winners

Statistical leaders

Awards

Helms College Basketball All-Americans 

The practice of selecting a Consensus All-American Team did not begin until the 1928–29 season. The Helms Athletic Foundation later retroactively selected a list of All-Americans for the 1917–18 season.

Major player of the year awards 

 Helms Player of the Year: Bill Chandler, Wisconsin (retroactive selection in 1944)

References